During the 1993–94 English football season, Queens Park Rangers F.C. competed in the Premier League. They finished the season in 9th place.

Season summary
Queens Park Rangers had another strong season, though they dipped slightly in the final table to finish ninth, a year after they had finished above all the other London clubs in fifth place. Manager Gerry Francis was even linked with the England job when Graham Taylor quit, but it went to Terry Venables - a former QPR manager himself.

Once again, striker Les Ferdinand was prolific up front and his name was constantly linked with big-money moves to top clubs as well as a regular England place. The rest of the squad performed solidly without attracting many headlines.

Final league table

Results
Queens Park Rangers' score comes first

Legend

FA Premier League

FA Cup

League Cup

Players

First-team squad
Squad at end of season

Reserve squad

Notes

References

Queens Park Rangers F.C. seasons
Queens Park Rangers